Flavio Cipolla and Goran Tošić are the defending champions, but did not participate.

Mikhail Elgin and Igor Zelenay won the title, defeating Andrea Arnaboldi and Matteo Viola in the final, 6–3, 6–3.

Seeds

Draw

References
 Main Draw

Kazan Kremlin Cup - Doubles
Kazan Kremlin Cup
2015 in Russian tennis